Michel Soulié (10 February 1916 - 15 September 1989) was a French politician.

Soulié was born in Saint-Étienne.  He represented the Radical Party in the National Assembly from 1956 to 1958.

References

1916 births
1989 deaths
Politicians from Saint-Étienne
Radical Party (France) politicians
Deputies of the 3rd National Assembly of the French Fourth Republic
French military personnel of World War II
French Resistance members